Alf Åke Robertson (8 June 1941 – 24 December 2008) was a Swedish country singer and composer who produced 50 albums and about 150 songs during his lifetime, and scoring album successes in Sweden. He died on 24 December 2008 after a spell of serious illness.

Discography
 1969 - En liten fågel sjöng
 1970 - Möt Alf Robertson
 1971 - Fille filur
 1972 - Närmast till att leva
 1973 - Sånger mina vänner sjöng
 1974 - Alf i Nashville
 1974 - Alf in Nashville (same melody but with English lyrics)
 1976 - Hundar och ungar och hembrygt äppelvin
 1977 - Ibland är det som en himmel
 1977 - Några få minuter
 1978 - Help the cowboy sing the blues
 1979 - Nostalgi
 1981 - Mitt Land
 1982 - Emilys foto
 1982 - Symfoni
 1982 - Till Ada med kärlek (Alf Robertson sings Lasse Dahlquist)
 1983 - Det kommer från hjärtat
 1983 - Tellus
 1984 - Vår värld
 1985 - Alf Robertson Solsken - best from 1977–1979
 1986 - Livet är ju som det är
 1987 - Såna som jag
 1989 - Tacka vet jag vanligt folk
 1990 - Liljor
 1991 - Country classics
 1992 - I väntan på Dolly
 1993 - Adios amigo (Alf Robertson sings Gunnar Wiklund)
 1995 - Hundar och ungar och hembrygt äppelvin (collection-cd)
 1997 - I full frihet
 2001 - Guldkorn
 2001 - Soldaten och kortleken-32 av mina bästa låtar
 2002 - En liten Femöres kola 1968–86
 2002 - Rosenkyssar
 2003 - Alf Robertson Klassiker
 2007 - Alf Robertsons Bästa

References

1941 births
2008 deaths
Swedish country singers
20th-century Swedish male singers